"UR" and "A Tear in the Open" are two electronic music tracks which appeared on Tiësto's second studio album in 2004, entitled Just Be. Unlike Tiesto's other album from 2004, Parade of the Athletes, Just Be featured only unmixed tracks.

Tom Holkenborg, also known as Junkie XL, remixed the track "UR",  The song originally features Matt Hales from Aqualung who wrote and sang the lyrics in the track and was later featured in Tiësto's In Search of Sunrise 4: Latin America compilation.

The B-side from "UR" is "A Tear in the Open", which was remixed by Leama & Moor and was later included along the remix of "UR" in Just Be: Remixed which features a variety of remixes from tracks of the album, the remix album was officially released in 2006 after the remixes were compiled.

"A Tear In The Open" is originally a Gaelic folk song called Ailein duinn, first featured as a film score in the movie Rob Roy and afterwards as the well known interpretation by Scottish folk band Capercaillie. On this track the vocals were sampled as a courtesy of Spectrasonics' Vocal Planet. Many more other artists sampled from the same music library to compose their own version of the folk song.

The title of the 12" vinyl can be read as "UR a Tear in the Open" and stands alone as a simple sentence. The album cover for the single was expected as an alternative cover of the album Just Be, the album itself had various covers, but some were later used on singles; Such is the case of this vinyl.

Formats and track listings

12" Vinyl
Magik Muzik, Nebula 12" Vinyl
 "UR" (Junkie XL Air Guitar Mix)–12:32
 "A Tear In The Open (Leama & Moor Remix)–9:56

Personnel
 "UR (Junkie XL Air Guitar Mix)
 Additional Producer, Remixer: Junkie XL
 Vocals: Aqualung
 Writer(s): Matt Hales, Tiësto, Naomi Striemer & Michael Scherchen
 Composers(s): Matt Hales , Michael Scherchen & Naomi Striemer
 Aqualung appears courtesy of First Column Management.
 Tom Holkenborg (Junkie XL) appears courtesy of Roadrunner Records B.V
 "A Tear In The Open (Leama & Moor Remix)"''
 Additional Producer, Remixer: Leama & Moor
 Writers(s): Tiësto, Geert Huinink & Daniël Stewart
 Composer(s): Daniël Stewart, Geert Huinink

Official versions
 "UR" (Junkie XL Air Guitar Remix) – 12:32
 "UR" (Junkie XL Air Guitar Remix) – 7:31 (as featured in In Search of Sunrise 4: Latin America)
 "A Tear In The Open" (Leama & Moor Remix) 9:56

Charts

Release history

References

Tiësto songs
Trance songs
2005 songs
Songs written by Tiësto